Anomospermum is a genus of flowering plants in the family Menispermaceae. It consists of six species from tropical America.

References

External links
 Flora Brasiliensis: Anomospermum

Menispermaceae genera
Neotropical realm flora
Menispermaceae